Tifanny Abreu (born 1984, Goiás, Brazil) is a Brazilian volleyball player. She was the first trans woman to play in the Brazilian Women's Volleyball Superliga.

Before playing in women's championships, she competed as a man for Superliga A and B in Brazil, and other championships in the leagues of Indonesia, Portugal, Spain, France, the Netherlands and Belgium. While in JTV Dero Zele-Berlare, Abreu decided to complete her gender transition. In 2017, she received permission from the International Volleyball Federation to compete in women's leagues.

In 2018 Abreu ran as a candidate for the Brazilian Democratic Movement Party.

In June 2020, in honor of the 50th anniversary of the first LGBTQ Pride parade, Queerty named her among the fifty heroes “leading the nation toward equality, acceptance, and dignity for all people”.

Clubs

References 

Brazilian women's volleyball players
Transgender politicians
Transgender sportswomen
1984 births
Living people
Brazilian LGBT sportspeople
LGBT volleyball players
Brazilian expatriate sportspeople in Portugal
Brazilian expatriate sportspeople in Belgium
Brazilian expatriate sportspeople in Italy
Expatriate volleyball players in Belgium
Expatriate volleyball players in Italy
Sportspeople from Goiás